Paradise tree snake or paradise flying snake (Chrysopelea paradisi) is a species of snake found in southeastern Asia. It can, like all species of its genus Chrysopelea, glide by stretching the body into a flattened strip using its ribs. It is mostly found in moist forests and can cover a horizontal distance of 10 meters or more in a glide from the top of a tree.  Slow motion photography shows an undulation of the snake's body in flight while the head remains relatively stable, suggesting controlled flight.  They are mildly venomous with rear fangs and also can constrict their prey, which consists of mostly lizards and bats.

Kinematics
The flying snake has a unique kinematic that is different compared to other animals with gliding or flight because they are cylindrical and do not have limbs such as legs or wings. Although the flying snake does not display visible characteristics that contribute to its ability to glide, there are three aspects that have been studied and found to have great positive effects on this. Their form of takeoff which is most commonly the anchored J-loop take-off, once airborne their cross sectional body is shaped into a triangle  and their bodies use an aerial undulation to maximize the distance traveled.

Distribution
Thailand (incl. Phuket), Cambodia, Indonesia (Bangka, Belitung, Java, Mentawai Archipelago, Natuna Archipelago, Nias, Riau Archipelago, Sumatra, We, Borneo, Sulawesi), Brunei Darussalam; India (Andaman Islands), Malaysia (Malaya and East Malaysia); Myanmar (Burma); Philippine Islands (including Sulu Archipelago, Negros Oriental, Siquijor, Panay, Luzon); Singapore; Race celebensis: Indonesia (Sulawesi) ; Bangladesh (Sylhet, Chittagong, Khulna, Race: Golden Flying Snake).

Race variabilis: Philippine Islands (including Sulu Archipelago)

References

 Boie, F. 1827 Bemerkungen über Merrem's Versuch eines Systems der Amphibien, 1. Lieferung: Ophidier. Isis van Oken, Jena, 20: 508–566.

External links
 
 
 
 Flying snake home page by Jake Socha
 C. paradisi at Thailand Snakes.
 Flying Snake Video w/additional info.
 Research related article.

Colubrids
Gliding snakes
Reptiles of Brunei
Reptiles of Myanmar
Reptiles of India
Reptiles of Indonesia
Reptiles of Malaysia
Reptiles of the Philippines
Reptiles of Singapore
Reptiles of Thailand
Reptiles of Borneo
Reptiles described in 1827